Graduate School of Medicine and Faculty of Medicine (京都大学大学院医学研究科・医学部) is one of the schools at the Kyoto University. The Faculty and the Graduate School operate as one.

According to the QS World University Rankings for Medicine 2020, Kyoto University is ranked second in Japan after University of Tokyo.

Professor Shinya Yamanaka received the Nobel Prize in Physiology or Medicine in 2012 for his work on iPS cells. Also, Prof. Emer. Tasuku Honjo, who is also a graduate of Kyoto University, won the Nobel Prize in Physiology or Medicine in 2018 for his discovery and theory of immune checkpoint inhibitors.

History 
In 1899, College of Medicine (医科大学) and its hospital (now ) was established Imperial University of Kyoto. In 1919, The college is renamed Faculty of Medicine (医学部).

Established in 1939, the School of Medicine's Department of Pharmacy became an independent Faculty of Pharmaceutical Sciences and Graduate School of Pharmaceutical Sciences in 1960.

In 2003, the Health Sciences (now Human Health Sciences) Department was added.

Organization 
The Faculty has two undergraduate courses and four graduate courses.

Faculty of Medicine 
Faculty of Medicine has two undergraduate courses.
 Medicine (医学科) - 6-year Undergraduate medical school
 Human Health Sciences (人間健康科学科) - 4-year undergraduate course in health sciences

Graduate School of Medicine 
Graduate School of Medicine has 4 graduate courses.
 Medicine and Medical Science (医学・医科学専攻) - Master's and Doctor's
 Public Health (社会健康医学系専攻) - Master of Public Health and Doctor's
 Human Health Sciences (人間健康科学系専攻) - Master's and Doctor's
 Kyoto-McGill International Collaborative Program in Genomic Medicine (京都大学・マギル大学ゲノム医学国際連携専攻) - Doctor's

Kyoto University Hospital 
 (京都大学医学部附属病院) is a Clinical Research Core Hospital designated by the Ministry of Health, Labor and Welfare.

Kyoto University School of Public Health 
Kyoto University School of Public Health (SPH, 京都大学 大学院医学研究科 社会健康医学系専攻), established in 2000, is Japan's oldest public health professional school. It is a division of the Graduate School of Medicine.

SPH has double degree agreements with Chulalongkorn University and Mahidol University in Thailand, Universiti Malaya in Malaysia, and National Taiwan University in Taiwan.

College of Medical Technology 

College of Medical Technology, Kyoto University (京都大学医療技術短期大学部) was a junior college of nursing, medical laboratory science, physiotherapy, occupational therapy, and midwifery. The college was absorbed into the Faculty and Graduate School in 2007.

Alumni association 

 Shirankai (芝蘭会) - Medical Student Alumni
 Shiryokai (紫緑会) - Health Science Student Alumni

See also 

 Medical education in Japan

References

External links 

 https://www.med.kyoto-u.ac.jp/

Kyoto University
Medical